Scott Kolk (May 16, 1905 – December 1, 1993) was an American actor in the 1920s and 1930s. He is most notable for his roles in All Quiet on the Western Front and Secret Agent X-9.

Filmography

External links
 

1905 births
1993 deaths
American male film actors
Male actors from Baltimore
20th-century American male actors
People from Canton, Maine